Lionel Danthanarayana (born 24 August 1940 – died 30 July 1994 as ලයනල් දැරණියගල) [Sinhala]), popularly as stage name Lionel Deraniyagala, was an actor in Sri Lankan cinema and theater. One of the most popular villain artists ever in Sri Lankan film history, he had a career for more than three decades as the antagonist.

Personal life
He was born on 24 August 1940 in Galle as the youngest of the family with three siblings. He completed his education at Mahinda College, Galle.

He was married to fellow actress Thilaka in 1973. The couple has one daughter, Priyanthi Shyamali, and one son, Chulananda.

In 1975, he was working in the batik industry with his wife. In 1981, he went Middle East for a job. He returned to Sri Lanka in 1983 and continued on business.

Deraniyagala fell ill at Ragama rehabilitation hospital after an accident on February 4, 1994. However, he died on 30 July 1994 at the age of 53.

Career
He has acted in minor roles on the school stage. At the age of 14, he met popular film actor and filmmaker B. A. W. Jayamanne along with his closest friend and eventual film actor Senaka Perera. At that time, Jayamanne was preparing for the film Kale Handa and was looking for a young man to play the role of "John Jayapala". Although Senaka introduced Deraniyagala to Jayamanna, it was age that mattered. Jayamanne informed Deraniyagala to meet him after finishing school times. After completing his studies, he came to Colombo to find a job at the age of 20. In 1960, he was selected for the lead role in the film Ekolos Ginna directed by Gilbert Hewavitharana. Hewavitharana changed his birth name Danthanarayana to Deraniyagala. Although the film was not produced, he was left with the name "Deraniyagala".

While working as a booking clerk at Lionel Ceylon Theaters, he met filmmaker Roland Amarasinghe. Amarasinghe asked him to come to Navajeewana Theater for the screen test. He was selected for the lead role of "Udeni" in the 1966 film Kolamba Hadayo with the new actress Shirani Gunatilleke. Meanwhile, he was selected to the stage play Abhimanaya produced by Sudas Masakorala. Then in the 1969 film Mee Masso, he acted along with Gamini Fonseka and Sonia Disa.

Deraniyagala emerged as an antagonist in the 1971 blockbuster film Hathara Denama Soorayo directed by Neil Rupasinghe. After the film, popular actor Eddie Jayamanne appreciated his villain role and said that "You are the best villain after Dommy Jayawardena". Since that, he received several villain roles in popular films Rena Giraw, Ran Onchilla, Rajagedara Paraviyo, Edath Suraya Adath Suraya, Gijulihiniyo, Kesara Sinhayo, Ridee Thella, Kasthuri Suwanda and Raja Kello. He played the lead role in the 1979 film Sawdan Jema bringing a sense of humor. He also played a caricature in the 1973 film Sinawai Inawai and then Deraniyagala played a different role as Gamini Fonseka's brother in the 1978 film Apsara.

Deraniyagala acted with his wife in few films including Gijulihiniyo, Vanarayo and Raja Kollo. After had children, his wife quit acting.

He acted in a few stage plays such as Suli Sulang and Rella.

In 1990, Deraniyagala won a Merit Award for the film Randenigala Sinhaya at the Sarasaviya Film Festival.

Filmography

References

External links

1940 births
1994 deaths
Sri Lankan male film actors
Sinhalese male actors
Alumni of Mahinda College
Sri Lankan male stage actors